Stomphastis polygoni is a moth of the family Gracillariidae. It is found primarily in China (Hong Kong, Yunnan, Hainan and Guangdong) and Zimbabwe.

The larvae feed on Polygonum setosulum. They mine the leaves of their host plant. The mine has the form of a rather large, very irregular, oblong, transparent blotch mine which starts as a long, narrow gallery.

References

Stomphastis
Insects of China
Lepidoptera of Zimbabwe
Moths of Sub-Saharan Africa